Franklin Junior/Senior High School is a school in Franklin in Morgan County, Illinois. The mascot is the Flashes and their colors are orange and black. All high school sports co-op with Waverly High School in Waverly to form the South County Vipers. Their colors are also orange and black.

References

Public high schools in Illinois
Schools in Morgan County, Illinois